The Church of the Sacred Heart of Jesus is a Modernist church in the civil parish of Ermesinde, in the municipality of Valongo, in the Portuguese district of Porto. The religious temple actually goes by several names, including the Church of the Good Shepherd or Sanctuary of the Sacred Heart of Jesus, a Catholic shrine dedicated to the worship of the Sacred Heart of Jesus.

History

The church was built between 14 July 1957 and 21 April 1966, and consecrated in fulfillment of a vow made by Sister Mary of the Divine Heart, the Countess Droste zu Vischering, a religious personality known for influencing Pope Leo XIII to make a consecration of the world to the Sacred Heart of Jesus.

Later, in 1964, this Catholic nun of the Congregation of Our Lady of Charity of the Good Shepherd and Mother Superior of the Convent of the Good Shepherd of Porto was proclaimed Venerable by the Catholic Church and was later beatified on 1 November 1975, by Pope Paul VI.

According to the writings of Sister Mary of the Divine Heart, Jesus had revealed to her a promise in relation to the church-shrine:

This church-shrine has become an important place for Christian pilgrims seeking to deepen their devotion to the Sacred Heart of Jesus through the life, virtues and work of Sister Mary of the Divine Heart.

Architecture
Inside this Catholic shrine, there is the tomb-reliquary with the remains of Sister Mary of the Divine Heart exposed to public veneration.

References

Roman Catholic churches completed in 1966
Bom Pastor
Roman Catholic shrines in Portugal
20th-century Roman Catholic church buildings in Portugal